Richard Bateman-Robson (1753–1827), of Manchester Square, Middlesex and Weybridge, Surrey, was an English politician.

He was born the younger son of Henry Holland, a builder of Church Row, Fulham, Middlesex. His elder brother was Henry Holland, the well-known architect and son in law of Lancelot "Capability" Brown, through his marriage to Brown's eldest daughter, Bridget.

Richard married Elizabeth, the daughter and heiress of solicitor Bateman Robson of Hartford, Huntingdonshire and took the surnames of Bateman Robson by royal licence in 1791. They had no children.

He was a Member of Parliament (MP) for Okehampton from 1796 to 1802 and 1806 to 1807, for Honiton on 11 April 1806 – 1806 and for Shaftesbury in 1812 – 19 February 1813.

He became Chairman of Grand Junction Waterworks Company in 1817.

References

1753 births
1827 deaths
People from Marylebone
People from Weybridge
Members of the Parliament of Great Britain for Okehampton
British MPs 1796–1800
Members of the Parliament of the United Kingdom for Honiton
UK MPs 1801–1802
UK MPs 1806–1807
UK MPs 1812–1818